Henry Dennis was a hymnist.

Henry Dennis may also refer to:
Henry Dennis (sheriff)
William Dnnis of Gresford colliery

See also
Harry Dennis (disambiguation)